

Bi

Bib-Big

|- class="vcard"
| class="fn org" | Bibstone
| class="adr" | South Gloucestershire
| 
| class="note" | 
|- class="vcard"
| class="fn org" | Bibury
| class="adr" | Gloucestershire
| 
| class="note" | 
|- class="vcard"
| class="fn org" | Bicester
| class="adr" | Oxfordshire
| 
| class="note" | 
|- class="vcard"
| class="fn org" | Bickenhall
| class="adr" | Somerset
| 
| class="note" | 
|- class="vcard"
| class="fn org" | Bickenhill
| class="adr" | Solihull
| 
| class="note" | 
|- class="vcard"
| class="fn org" | Bicker
| class="adr" | Lincolnshire
| 
| class="note" | 
|- class="vcard"
| class="fn org" | Bicker Bar
| class="adr" | Lincolnshire
| 
| class="note" | 
|- class="vcard"
| class="fn org" | Bicker Gauntlet
| class="adr" | Lincolnshire
| 
| class="note" | 
|- class="vcard"
| class="fn org" | Bickershaw
| class="adr" | Wigan
| 
| class="note" | 
|- class="vcard"
| class="fn org" | Bickerstaffe
| class="adr" | Lancashire
| 
| class="note" | 
|- class="vcard"
| class="fn org" | Bickerton
| class="adr" | Devon
| 
| class="note" | 
|- class="vcard"
| class="fn org" | Bickerton
| class="adr" | North Yorkshire
| 
| class="note" | 
|- class="vcard"
| class="fn org" | Bickerton
| class="adr" | Cheshire
| 
| class="note" | 
|- class="vcard"
| class="fn org" | Bickford
| class="adr" | Staffordshire
| 
| class="note" | 
|- class="vcard"
| class="fn org" | Bickham
| class="adr" | Somerset
| 
| class="note" | 
|- class="vcard"
| class="fn org" | Bickingcott
| class="adr" | Devon
| 
| class="note" | 
|- class="vcard"
| class="fn org" | Bickington (Fremington nr Barnstaple)
| class="adr" | Devon
| 
| class="note" | 
|- class="vcard"
| class="fn org" | Bickington (Teignbridge)
| class="adr" | Devon
| 
| class="note" | 
|- class="vcard"
| class="fn org" | Bickleigh (Mid Devon)
| class="adr" | Devon
| 
| class="note" | 
|- class="vcard"
| class="fn org" | Bickleigh (South Hams)
| class="adr" | Devon
| 
| class="note" | 
|- class="vcard"
| class="fn org" | Bickleton
| class="adr" | Devon
| 
| class="note" | 
|- class="vcard"
| class="fn org" | Bickley
| class="adr" | Bromley
| 
| class="note" | 
|- class="vcard"
| class="fn org" | Bickley
| class="adr" | Worcestershire
| 
| class="note" | 
|- class="vcard"
| class="fn org" | Bickley Moss
| class="adr" | Cheshire
| 
| class="note" | 
|- class="vcard"
| class="fn org" | Bickley Town
| class="adr" | Cheshire
| 
| class="note" | 
|- class="vcard"
| class="fn org" | Bickleywood
| class="adr" | Cheshire
| 
| class="note" | 
|- class="vcard"
| class="fn org" | Bickmarsh
| class="adr" | Worcestershire
| 
| class="note" | 
|- class="vcard"
| class="fn org" | Bicknacre
| class="adr" | Essex
| 
| class="note" | 
|- class="vcard"
| class="fn org" | Bicknoller
| class="adr" | Somerset
| 
| class="note" | 
|- class="vcard"
| class="fn org" | Bicknor
| class="adr" | Kent
| 
| class="note" | 
|- class="vcard"
| class="fn org" | Bickton
| class="adr" | Hampshire
| 
| class="note" | 
|- class="vcard"
| class="fn org" | Bicton
| class="adr" | Herefordshire
| 
| class="note" | 
|- class="vcard"
| class="fn org" | Bicton
| class="adr" | Pembrokeshire
| 
| class="note" | 
|- class="vcard"
| class="fn org" | Bicton (Shrewsbury and Acton)
| class="adr" | Shropshire
| 
| class="note" | 
|- class="vcard"
| class="fn org" | Bicton (South Shropshire)
| class="adr" | Shropshire
| 
| class="note" | 
|- class="vcard"
| class="fn org" | Bicton Heath
| class="adr" | Shropshire
| 
| class="note" | 
|- class="vcard"
| class="fn org" | Bidborough
| class="adr" | Kent
| 
| class="note" | 
|- class="vcard"
| class="fn org" | Bidden
| class="adr" | Hampshire
| 
| class="note" | 
|- class="vcard"
| class="fn org" | Biddenden
| class="adr" | Kent
| 
| class="note" | 
|- class="vcard"
| class="fn org" | Biddenden Green
| class="adr" | Kent
| 
| class="note" | 
|- class="vcard"
| class="fn org" | Biddenham
| class="adr" | Bedfordshire
| 
| class="note" | 
|- class="vcard"
| class="fn org" | Biddestone
| class="adr" | Wiltshire
| 
| class="note" | 
|- class="vcard"
| class="fn org" | Biddick
| class="adr" | Sunderland
| 
| class="note" | 
|- class="vcard"
| class="fn org" | Biddick Hall
| class="adr" | South Tyneside
| 
| class="note" | 
|- class="vcard"
| class="fn org" | Biddisham
| class="adr" | Somerset
| 
| class="note" | 
|- class="vcard"
| class="fn org" | Biddlesden
| class="adr" | Buckinghamshire
| 
| class="note" | 
|- class="vcard"
| class="fn org" | Biddulph
| class="adr" | Staffordshire
| 
| class="note" | 
|- class="vcard"
| class="fn org" | Biddulph Moor
| class="adr" | Staffordshire
| 
| class="note" | 
|- class="vcard"
| class="fn org" | Bideford
| class="adr" | Devon
| 
| class="note" | 
|- class="vcard"
| class="fn org" | Bidford-on-Avon
| class="adr" | Warwickshire
| 
| class="note" | 
|- class="vcard"
| class="fn org" | Bidlake
| class="adr" | Devon
| 
| class="note" | 
|- class="vcard"
| class="fn org" | Bidston
| class="adr" | Wirral
| 
| class="note" | 
|- class="vcard"
| class="fn org" | Bidston Hill
| class="adr" | Wirral
| 
| class="note" | 
|- class="vcard"
| class="fn org" | Bidwell
| class="adr" | Bedfordshire
| 
| class="note" | 
|- class="vcard"
| class="fn org" | Bielby
| class="adr" | East Riding of Yorkshire
| 
| class="note" | 
|- class="vcard"
| class="fn org" | Bieldside
| class="adr" | City of Aberdeen
| 
| class="note" | 
|- class="vcard"
| class="fn org" | Bierley
| class="adr" | Bradford
| 
| class="note" | 
|- class="vcard"
| class="fn org" | Bierley
| class="adr" | Isle of Wight
| 
| class="note" | 
|- class="vcard"
| class="fn org" | Bierton
| class="adr" | Buckinghamshire
| 
| class="note" | 
|- class="vcard"
| class="fn org" | Bigbury
| class="adr" | Devon
| 
| class="note" | 
|- class="vcard"
| class="fn org" | Bigbury-on-Sea
| class="adr" | Devon
| 
| class="note" | 
|- class="vcard"
| class="fn org" | Bigby
| class="adr" | Lincolnshire
| 
| class="note" | 
|- class="vcard"
| class="fn org" | Bigfrith
| class="adr" | Berkshire
| 
| class="note" | 
|- class="vcard"
| class="fn org" | Bigga
| class="adr" | Shetland Islands
| 
| class="note" | 
|- class="vcard"
| class="fn org" | Biggar
| class="adr" | South Lanarkshire
| 
| class="note" | 
|- class="vcard"
| class="fn org" | Biggar
| class="adr" | Cumbria
| 
| class="note" | 
|- class="vcard"
| class="fn org" | Biggin (Hartington)
| class="adr" | Derbyshire
| 
| class="note" | 
|- class="vcard"
| class="fn org" | Biggin (near Hulland)
| class="adr" | Derbyshire
| 
| class="note" | 
|- class="vcard"
| class="fn org" | Biggin
| class="adr" | Essex
| 
| class="note" | 
|- class="vcard"
| class="fn org" | Biggin
| class="adr" | North Yorkshire
| 
| class="note" | 
|- class="vcard"
| class="fn org" | Biggings
| class="adr" | Shetland Islands
| 
| class="note" | 
|- class="vcard"
| class="fn org" | Biggin Hill
| class="adr" | Bromley
| 
| class="note" | 
|- class="vcard"
| class="fn org" | Biggleswade
| class="adr" | Bedfordshire
| 
| class="note" | 
|- class="vcard"
| class="fn org" | Bighton
| class="adr" | Hampshire
| 
| class="note" | 
|- class="vcard"
| class="fn org" | Biglands
| class="adr" | Cumbria
| 
| class="note" | 
|- class="vcard"
| class="fn org" | Big Mancot
| class="adr" | Flintshire
| 
| class="note" | 
|- class="vcard"
| class="fn org" | Bignall End
| class="adr" | Staffordshire
| 
| class="note" | 
|- class="vcard"
| class="fn org" | Bignor
| class="adr" | West Sussex
| 
| class="note" | 
|- class="vcard"
| class="fn org" | Bigods
| class="adr" | Essex
| 
| class="note" | 
|- class="vcard"
| class="fn org" | Bigrigg
| class="adr" | Cumbria
| 
| class="note" | 
|- class="vcard"
| class="fn org" | Big Sand
| class="adr" | Highland
| 
| class="note" | 
|- class="vcard"
| class="fn org" | Bigton
| class="adr" | Shetland Islands
| 
| class="note" | 
|}

Bil-Bin

|- class="vcard"
| class="fn org" | Bilberry
| class="adr" | Cornwall
| 
| class="note" | 
|- class="vcard"
| class="fn org" | Bilborough
| class="adr" | Nottinghamshire
| 
| class="note" | 
|- class="vcard"
| class="fn org" | Bilbrook
| class="adr" | Somerset
| 
| class="note" | 
|- class="vcard"
| class="fn org" | Bilbrook
| class="adr" | Staffordshire
| 
| class="note" | 
|- class="vcard"
| class="fn org" | Bilbrough
| class="adr" | North Yorkshire
| 
| class="note" | 
|- class="vcard"
| class="fn org" | Bilbster
| class="adr" | Highland
| 
| class="note" | 
|- class="vcard"
| class="fn org" | Bilbster Mains
| class="adr" | Highland
| 
| class="note" | 
|- class="vcard"
| class="fn org" | Bilby
| class="adr" | Nottinghamshire
| 
| class="note" | 
|- class="vcard"
| class="fn org" | Bildershaw
| class="adr" | Durham
| 
| class="note" | 
|- class="vcard"
| class="fn org" | Bildeston
| class="adr" | Suffolk
| 
| class="note" | 
|- class="vcard"
| class="fn org" | Billacombe
| class="adr" | Devon
| 
| class="note" | 
|- class="vcard"
| class="fn org" | Billacott
| class="adr" | Cornwall
| 
| class="note" | 
|- class="vcard"
| class="fn org" | Billericay
| class="adr" | Essex
| 
| class="note" | 
|- class="vcard"
| class="fn org" | Billesdon
| class="adr" | Leicestershire
| 
| class="note" | 
|- class="vcard"
| class="fn org" | Billesley
| class="adr" | Birmingham
| 
| class="note" | 
|- class="vcard"
| class="fn org" | Billesley
| class="adr" | Warwickshire
| 
| class="note" | 
|- class="vcard"
| class="fn org" | Billesley Common
| class="adr" | Birmingham
| 
| class="note" | 
|- class="vcard"
| class="fn org" | Billingborough
| class="adr" | Lincolnshire
| 
| class="note" | 
|- class="vcard"
| class="fn org" | Billinge
| class="adr" | St Helens
| 
| class="note" | 
|- class="vcard"
| class="fn org" | Billingford (South Norfolk)
| class="adr" | Norfolk
| 
| class="note" | 
|- class="vcard"
| class="fn org" | Billingford (Breckland)
| class="adr" | Norfolk
| 
| class="note" | 
|- class="vcard"
| class="fn org" | Billingham
| class="adr" | Stockton-on-Tees
| 
| class="note" | 
|- class="vcard"
| class="fn org" | Billinghay
| class="adr" | Lincolnshire
| 
| class="note" | 
|- class="vcard"
| class="fn org" | Billingley
| class="adr" | Barnsley
| 
| class="note" | 
|- class="vcard"
| class="fn org" | Billingshurst
| class="adr" | West Sussex
| 
| class="note" | 
|- class="vcard"
| class="fn org" | Billingsley
| class="adr" | Shropshire
| 
| class="note" | 
|- class="vcard"
| class="fn org" | Billington
| class="adr" | Bedfordshire
| 
| class="note" | 
|- class="vcard"
| class="fn org" | Billington
| class="adr" | Lancashire
| 
| class="note" | 
|- class="vcard"
| class="fn org" | Billington
| class="adr" | Staffordshire
| 
| class="note" | 
|- class="vcard"
| class="fn org" | Billockby
| class="adr" | Norfolk
| 
| class="note" | 
|- class="vcard"
| class="fn org" | Bill Quay
| class="adr" | Gateshead
| 
| class="note" | 
|- class="vcard"
| class="fn org" | Billy Mill
| class="adr" | North Tyneside
| 
| class="note" | 
|- class="vcard"
| class="fn org" | Billy Row
| class="adr" | Durham
| 
| class="note" | 
|- class="vcard"
| class="fn org" | Bilmarsh
| class="adr" | Shropshire
| 
| class="note" | 
|- class="vcard"
| class="fn org" | Bilsborrow
| class="adr" | Lancashire
| 
| class="note" | 
|- class="vcard"
| class="fn org" | Bilsby
| class="adr" | Lincolnshire
| 
| class="note" | 
|- class="vcard"
| class="fn org" | Bilsby Field
| class="adr" | Lincolnshire
| 
| class="note" | 
|- class="vcard"
| class="fn org" | Bilsdon
| class="adr" | Devon
| 
| class="note" | 
|- class="vcard"
| class="fn org" | Bilsham
| class="adr" | West Sussex
| 
| class="note" | 
|- class="vcard"
| class="fn org" | Bilsington
| class="adr" | Kent
| 
| class="note" | 
|- class="vcard"
| class="fn org" | Bilson Green
| class="adr" | Gloucestershire
| 
| class="note" | 
|- class="vcard"
| class="fn org" | Bilsthorpe
| class="adr" | Nottinghamshire
| 
| class="note" | 
|- class="vcard"
| class="fn org" | Bilsthorpe Moor
| class="adr" | Nottinghamshire
| 
| class="note" | 
|- class="vcard"
| class="fn org" | Bilston
| class="adr" | Midlothian
| 
| class="note" | 
|- class="vcard"
| class="fn org" | Bilston
| class="adr" | Wolverhampton
| 
| class="note" | 
|- class="vcard"
| class="fn org" | Bilstone
| class="adr" | Leicestershire
| 
| class="note" | 
|- class="vcard"
| class="fn org" | Bilting
| class="adr" | Kent
| 
| class="note" | 
|- class="vcard"
| class="fn org" | Bilton
| class="adr" | East Riding of Yorkshire
| 
| class="note" | 
|- class="vcard"
| class="fn org" | Bilton
| class="adr" | Harrogate, North Yorkshire
| 
| class="note" | 
|- class="vcard"
| class="fn org" | Bilton
| class="adr" | Northumberland
| 
| class="note" | 
|- class="vcard"
| class="fn org" | Bilton
| class="adr" | Warwickshire
| 
| class="note" | 
|- class="vcard"
| class="fn org" | Bilton Haggs
| class="adr" | North Yorkshire
| 
| class="note" | 
|- class="vcard"
| class="fn org" | Bilton-in-Ainsty
| class="adr" | North Yorkshire
| 
| class="note" | 
|- class="vcard"
| class="fn org" | Bimbister
| class="adr" | Orkney Islands
| 
| class="note" | 
|- class="vcard"
| class="fn org" | Binbrook
| class="adr" | Lincolnshire
| 
| class="note" | 
|- class="vcard"
| class="fn org" | Binchester Blocks
| class="adr" | Durham
| 
| class="note" | 
|- class="vcard"
| class="fn org" | Bincombe
| class="adr" | Dorset
| 
| class="note" | 
|- class="vcard"
| class="fn org" | Bincombe
| class="adr" | Somerset
| 
| class="note" | 
|- class="vcard"
| class="fn org" | Bindal
| class="adr" | Highland
| 
| class="note" | 
|- class="vcard"
| class="fn org" | Bindon
| class="adr" | Somerset
| 
| class="note" | 
|- class="vcard"
| class="fn org" | Binegar
| class="adr" | Somerset
| 
| class="note" | 
|- class="vcard"
| class="fn org" | Bines Green
| class="adr" | West Sussex
| 
| class="note" | 
|- class="vcard"
| class="fn org" | Binfield
| class="adr" | Berkshire
| 
| class="note" | 
|- class="vcard"
| class="fn org" | Binfield Heath
| class="adr" | Oxfordshire
| 
| class="note" | 
|- class="vcard"
| class="fn org" | Bingfield
| class="adr" | Northumberland
| 
| class="note" | 
|- class="vcard"
| class="fn org" | Bingham
| class="adr" | Nottinghamshire
| 
| class="note" | 
|- class="vcard"
| class="fn org" | Bingham
| class="adr" | City of Edinburgh
| 
| class="note" | 
|- class="vcard"
| class="fn org" | Bingley
| class="adr" | Bradford
| 
| class="note" | 
|- class="vcard"
| class="fn org" | Bings Heath
| class="adr" | Shropshire
| 
| class="note" | 
|- class="vcard"
| class="fn org" | Binham
| class="adr" | Norfolk
| 
| class="note" | 
|- class="vcard"
| class="fn org" | Binley
| class="adr" | Coventry
| 
| class="note" | 
|- class="vcard"
| class="fn org" | Binley
| class="adr" | Hampshire
| 
| class="note" | 
|- class="vcard"
| class="fn org" | Binley Woods
| class="adr" | Warwickshire
| 
| class="note" | 
|- class="vcard"
| class="fn org" | Binnegar
| class="adr" | Dorset
| 
| class="note" | 
|- class="vcard"
| class="fn org" | Binniehill
| class="adr" | Falkirk
| 
| class="note" | 
|- class="vcard"
| class="fn org" | Binscombe
| class="adr" | Surrey
| 
| class="note" | 
|- class="vcard"
| class="fn org" | Binsey
| class="adr" | Oxfordshire
| 
| class="note" | 
|- class="vcard"
| class="fn org" | Binsoe
| class="adr" | North Yorkshire
| 
| class="note" | 
|- class="vcard"
| class="fn org" | Binstead
| class="adr" | Isle of Wight
| 
| class="note" | 
|- class="vcard"
| class="fn org" | Binsted
| class="adr" | Hampshire
| 
| class="note" | 
|- class="vcard"
| class="fn org" | Binsted
| class="adr" | West Sussex
| 
| class="note" | 
|- class="vcard"
| class="fn org" | Binton
| class="adr" | Warwickshire
| 
| class="note" | 
|- class="vcard"
| class="fn org" | Bintree
| class="adr" | Norfolk
| 
| class="note" | 
|}

Bir-Bix

|- class="vcard"
| class="fn org" | Birch
| class="adr" | Essex
| 
| class="note" | 
|- class="vcard"
| class="fn org" | Birch
| class="adr" | Rochdale
| 
| class="note" | 
|- class="vcard"
| class="fn org" | Birch Acre
| class="adr" | Worcestershire
| 
| class="note" | 
|- class="vcard"
| class="fn org" | Birchall
| class="adr" | Herefordshire
| 
| class="note" | 
|- class="vcard"
| class="fn org" | Birchall
| class="adr" | Staffordshire
| 
| class="note" | 
|- class="vcard"
| class="fn org" | Bircham Newton
| class="adr" | Norfolk
| 
| class="note" | 
|- class="vcard"
| class="fn org" | Bircham Tofts
| class="adr" | Norfolk
| 
| class="note" | 
|- class="vcard"
| class="fn org" | Birchanger
| class="adr" | Essex
| 
| class="note" | 
|- class="vcard"
| class="fn org" | Birch Berrow
| class="adr" | Worcestershire
| 
| class="note" | 
|- class="vcard"
| class="fn org" | Birchburn
| class="adr" | North Ayrshire
| 
| class="note" | 
|- class="vcard"
| class="fn org" | Birch Cross
| class="adr" | Staffordshire
| 
| class="note" | 
|- class="vcard"
| class="fn org" | Birchden
| class="adr" | East Sussex
| 
| class="note" | 
|- class="vcard"
| class="fn org" | Birchen
| class="adr" | Highland
| 
| class="note" | 
|- class="vcard"
| class="fn org" | Birchencliffe
| class="adr" | Kirklees
| 
| class="note" | 
|- class="vcard"
| class="fn org" | Birchen Coppice
| class="adr" | Worcestershire
| 
| class="note" | 
|- class="vcard"
| class="fn org" | Birchend
| class="adr" | Herefordshire
| 
| class="note" | 
|- class="vcard"
| class="fn org" | Birchendale
| class="adr" | Staffordshire
| 
| class="note" | 
|- class="vcard"
| class="fn org" | Bircher
| class="adr" | Herefordshire
| 
| class="note" | 
|- class="vcard"
| class="fn org" | Birches Green
| class="adr" | Birmingham
| 
| class="note" | 
|- class="vcard"
| class="fn org" | Birches Head
| class="adr" | City of Stoke-on-Trent
| 
| class="note" | 
|- class="vcard"
| class="fn org" | Birchett's Green
| class="adr" | East Sussex
| 
| class="note" | 
|- class="vcard"
| class="fn org" | Birchfield
| class="adr" | Birmingham
| 
| class="note" | 
|- class="vcard"
| class="fn org" | Birch Green
| class="adr" | Essex
| 
| class="note" | 
|- class="vcard"
| class="fn org" | Birch Green
| class="adr" | Herefordshire
| 
| class="note" | 
|- class="vcard"
| class="fn org" | Birch Green
| class="adr" | Hertfordshire
| 
| class="note" | 
|- class="vcard"
| class="fn org" | Birch Green
| class="adr" | Lancashire
| 
| class="note" | 
|- class="vcard"
| class="fn org" | Birchgrove
| class="adr" | West Sussex
| 
| class="note" | 
|- class="vcard"
| class="fn org" | Birchgrove
| class="adr" | Swansea
| 
| class="note" | 
|- class="vcard"
| class="fn org" | Birchgrove
| class="adr" | Caerdydd (Cardiff)
| 
| class="note" | 
|- class="vcard"
| class="fn org" | Birchhall Corner
| class="adr" | Essex
| 
| class="note" | 
|- class="vcard"
| class="fn org" | Birch Heath
| class="adr" | Cheshire
| 
| class="note" | 
|- class="vcard"
| class="fn org" | Birch Hill
| class="adr" | Berkshire
| 
| class="note" | 
|- class="vcard"
| class="fn org" | Birchill
| class="adr" | Devon
| 
| class="note" | 
|- class="vcard"
| class="fn org" | Birchills
| class="adr" | Walsall
| 
| class="note" | 
|- class="vcard"
| class="fn org" | Birchington
| class="adr" | Kent
| 
| class="note" | 
|- class="vcard"
| class="fn org" | Birchley Heath
| class="adr" | Warwickshire
| 
| class="note" | 
|- class="vcard"
| class="fn org" | Birchmoor
| class="adr" | Warwickshire
| 
| class="note" | 
|- class="vcard"
| class="fn org" | Birchmoor Green
| class="adr" | Bedfordshire
| 
| class="note" | 
|- class="vcard"
| class="fn org" | Bircholt Forstal
| class="adr" | Kent
| 
| class="note" | 
|- class="vcard"
| class="fn org" | Birchover
| class="adr" | Derbyshire
| 
| class="note" | 
|- class="vcard"
| class="fn org" | Birch Vale
| class="adr" | Derbyshire
| 
| class="note" | 
|- class="vcard"
| class="fn org" | Birchwood
| class="adr" | Cheshire
| 
| class="note" | 
|- class="vcard"
| class="fn org" | Birchwood
| class="adr" | Hertfordshire
| 
| class="note" | 
|- class="vcard"
| class="fn org" | Birchwood
| class="adr" | Lincolnshire
| 
| class="note" | 
|- class="vcard"
| class="fn org" | Birchwood
| class="adr" | Somerset
| 
| class="note" | 
|- class="vcard"
| class="fn org" | Birchwood Corner
| class="adr" | Kent
| 
| class="note" | 
|- class="vcard"
| class="fn org" | Birchy Hill
| class="adr" | Hampshire
| 
| class="note" | 
|- class="vcard"
| class="fn org" | Bircotes
| class="adr" | Nottinghamshire
| 
| class="note" | 
|- class="vcard"
| class="fn org" | Birdbrook
| class="adr" | Essex
| 
| class="note" | 
|- class="vcard"
| class="fn org" | Birdbush
| class="adr" | Wiltshire
| 
| class="note" | 
|- class="vcard"
| class="fn org" | Birdfield
| class="adr" | Argyll and Bute
| 
| class="note" | 
|- class="vcard"
| class="fn org" | Birdforth
| class="adr" | North Yorkshire
| 
| class="note" | 
|- class="vcard"
| class="fn org" | Bird Green
| class="adr" | Essex
| 
| class="note" | 
|- class="vcard"
| class="fn org" | Birdham
| class="adr" | West Sussex
| 
| class="note" | 
|- class="vcard"
| class="fn org" | Birdholme
| class="adr" | Derbyshire
| 
| class="note" | 
|- class="vcard"
| class="fn org" | Birdingbury
| class="adr" | Warwickshire
| 
| class="note" | 
|- class="vcard"
| class="fn org" | Birdlip
| class="adr" | Gloucestershire
| 
| class="note" | 
|- class="vcard"
| class="fn org" | Bird Obsy
| class="adr" | Shetland Islands
| 
| class="note" | 
|- class="vcard"
| class="fn org" | Birdsall
| class="adr" | North Yorkshire
| 
| class="note" | 
|- class="vcard"
| class="fn org" | Birdsedge
| class="adr" | Kirklees
| 
| class="note" | 
|- class="vcard"
| class="fn org" | Birds End
| class="adr" | Suffolk
| 
| class="note" | 
|- class="vcard"
| class="fn org" | Birdsgreen
| class="adr" | Shropshire
| 
| class="note" | 
|- class="vcard"
| class="fn org" | Birds Green
| class="adr" | Essex
| 
| class="note" | 
|- class="vcard"
| class="fn org" | Birdsmoorgate
| class="adr" | Dorset
| 
| class="note" | 
|- class="vcard"
| class="fn org" | Birdston
| class="adr" | East Dunbartonshire
| 
| class="note" | 
|- class="vcard"
| class="fn org" | Bird Street
| class="adr" | Suffolk
| 
| class="note" | 
|- class="vcard"
| class="fn org" | Birdwell
| class="adr" | Barnsley
| 
| class="note" | 
|- class="vcard"
| class="fn org" | Birdwood
| class="adr" | Gloucestershire
| 
| class="note" | 
|- class="vcard"
| class="fn org" | Birgham
| class="adr" | Scottish Borders
| 
| class="note" | 
|- class="vcard"
| class="fn org" | Birkacre
| class="adr" | Lancashire
| 
| class="note" | 
|- class="vcard"
| class="fn org" | Birkby
| class="adr" | Cumbria
| 
| class="note" | 
|- class="vcard"
| class="fn org" | Birkby
| class="adr" | North Yorkshire
| 
| class="note" | 
|- class="vcard"
| class="fn org" | Birkby
| class="adr" | Kirklees
| 
| class="note" | 
|- class="vcard"
| class="fn org" | Birkdale
| class="adr" | Sefton
| 
| class="note" | 
|- class="vcard"
| class="fn org" | Birkenhead
| class="adr" | Wirral
| 
| class="note" | 
|- class="vcard"
| class="fn org" | Birkenshaw
| class="adr" | Kirklees
| 
| class="note" | 
|- class="vcard"
| class="fn org" | Birkenshaw
| class="adr" | North Lanarkshire
| 
| class="note" | 
|- class="vcard"
| class="fn org" | Birkenshaw
| class="adr" | South Lanarkshire
| 
| class="note" | 
|- class="vcard"
| class="fn org" | Birkenshaw Bottoms
| class="adr" | Kirklees
| 
| class="note" | 
|- class="vcard"
| class="fn org" | Birkenside
| class="adr" | Scottish Borders
| 
| class="note" | 
|- class="vcard"
| class="fn org" | Birkett Mire
| class="adr" | Cumbria
| 
| class="note" | 
|- class="vcard"
| class="fn org" | Birkhill
| class="adr" | Scottish Borders
| 
| class="note" | 
|- class="vcard"
| class="fn org" | Birkhill
| class="adr" | Angus
| 
| class="note" | 
|- class="vcard"
| class="fn org" | Birkholme
| class="adr" | Lincolnshire
| 
| class="note" | 
|- class="vcard"
| class="fn org" | Birkhouse
| class="adr" | Calderdale
| 
| class="note" | 
|- class="vcard"
| class="fn org" | Birkin
| class="adr" | North Yorkshire
| 
| class="note" | 
|- class="vcard"
| class="fn org" | Birks
| class="adr" | Leeds
| 
| class="note" | 
|- class="vcard"
| class="fn org" | Birkshaw
| class="adr" | Northumberland
| 
| class="note" | 
|- class="vcard"
| class="fn org" | Birley
| class="adr" | Herefordshire
| 
| class="note" | 
|- class="vcard"
| class="fn org" | Birley
| class="adr" | Sheffield 
| 
| class="note" | 
|- class="vcard"
| class="fn org" | Birley Carr
| class="adr" | Sheffield
| 
| class="note" | 
|- class="vcard"
| class="fn org" | Birley Edge
| class="adr" | Sheffield
| 
| class="note" | 
|- class="vcard"
| class="fn org" | Birleyhay
| class="adr" | Derbyshire
| 
| class="note" | 
|- class="vcard"
| class="fn org" | Birling
| class="adr" | Kent
| 
| class="note" | 
|- class="vcard"
| class="fn org" | Birling Gap
| class="adr" | East Sussex
| 
| class="note" | 
|- class="vcard"
| class="fn org" | Birlingham
| class="adr" | Worcestershire
| 
| class="note" | 
|- class="vcard"
| class="fn org" | Birmingham
| class="adr" | 
| 
| class="note" | 
|- class="vcard"
| class="fn org" | Birnam
| class="adr" | Perth and Kinross
| 
| class="note" | 
|- class="vcard"
| class="fn org" | Birniehill
| class="adr" | South Lanarkshire
| 
| class="note" | 
|- class="vcard"
| class="fn org" | Birse
| class="adr" | Aberdeenshire
| 
| class="note" | 
|- class="vcard"
| class="fn org" | Birsemore
| class="adr" | Aberdeenshire
| 
| class="note" | 
|- class="vcard"
| class="fn org" | Birstall
| class="adr" | Kirklees
| 
| class="note" | 
|- class="vcard"
| class="fn org" | Birstall
| class="adr" | Leicestershire
| 
| class="note" | 
|- class="vcard"
| class="fn org" | Birstall Smithies
| class="adr" | Kirklees
| 
| class="note" | 
|- class="vcard"
| class="fn org" | Birstwith
| class="adr" | North Yorkshire
| 
| class="note" | 
|- class="vcard"
| class="fn org" | Birthorpe
| class="adr" | Lincolnshire
| 
| class="note" | 
|- class="vcard"
| class="fn org" | Birtle
| class="adr" | Rochdale
| 
| class="note" | 
|- class="vcard"
| class="fn org" | Birtley
| class="adr" | Herefordshire
| 
| class="note" | 
|- class="vcard"
| class="fn org" | Birtley
| class="adr" | Shropshire
| 
| class="note" | 
|- class="vcard"
| class="fn org" | Birtley
| class="adr" | Northumberland
| 
| class="note" | 
|- class="vcard"
| class="fn org" | Birtley
| class="adr" | Gateshead
| 
| class="note" | 
|- class="vcard"
| class="fn org" | Birtley Green
| class="adr" | Surrey
| 
| class="note" | 
|- class="vcard"
| class="fn org" | Birtsmorton
| class="adr" | Worcestershire
| 
| class="note" | 
|- class="vcard"
| class="fn org" | Birts Street
| class="adr" | Worcestershire
| 
| class="note" | 
|- class="vcard"
| class="fn org" | Bisbrooke
| class="adr" | Rutland
| 
| class="note" | 
|- class="vcard"
| class="fn org" | Biscathorpe
| class="adr" | Lincolnshire
| 
| class="note" | 
|- class="vcard"
| class="fn org" | Biscombe
| class="adr" | Somerset
| 
| class="note" | 
|- class="vcard"
| class="fn org" | Biscot
| class="adr" | Luton
| 
| class="note" | 
|- class="vcard"
| class="fn org" | Biscovey
| class="adr" | Cornwall
| 
| class="note" | 
|- class="vcard"
| class="fn org" | Bisham
| class="adr" | Berkshire
| 
| class="note" | 
|- class="vcard"
| class="fn org" | Bishampton
| class="adr" | Worcestershire
| 
| class="note" | 
|- class="vcard"
| class="fn org" | Bish Mill
| class="adr" | Devon
| 
| class="note" | 
|- class="vcard"
| class="fn org" | Bishon Common
| class="adr" | Herefordshire
| 
| class="note" | 
|- class="vcard"
| class="fn org" | Bishop Auckland
| class="adr" | Durham
| 
| class="note" | 
|- class="vcard"
| class="fn org" | Bishopbridge
| class="adr" | Lincolnshire
| 
| class="note" | 
|- class="vcard"
| class="fn org" | Bishopbriggs
| class="adr" | East Dunbartonshire
| 
| class="note" | 
|- class="vcard"
| class="fn org" | Bishop Burton
| class="adr" | East Riding of Yorkshire
| 
| class="note" | 
|- class="vcard"
| class="fn org" | Bishopdown
| class="adr" | Wiltshire
| 
| class="note" | 
|- class="vcard"
| class="fn org" | Bishop Kinkell
| class="adr" | Highland
| 
| class="note" | 
|- class="vcard"
| class="fn org" | Bishop Middleham
| class="adr" | Durham
| 
| class="note" | 
|- class="vcard"
| class="fn org" | Bishopmill
| class="adr" | Moray
| 
| class="note" | 
|- class="vcard"
| class="fn org" | Bishop Monkton
| class="adr" | North Yorkshire
| 
| class="note" | 
|- class="vcard"
| class="fn org" | Bishop Norton
| class="adr" | Lincolnshire
| 
| class="note" | 
|- class="vcard"
| class="fn org" | Bishopsbourne
| class="adr" | Kent
| 
| class="note" | 
|- class="vcard"
| class="fn org" | Bishops Cannings
| class="adr" | Wiltshire
| 
| class="note" | 
|- class="vcard"
| class="fn org" | Bishop's Castle
| class="adr" | Shropshire
| 
| class="note" | 
|- class="vcard"
| class="fn org" | Bishop's Caundle
| class="adr" | Dorset
| 
| class="note" | 
|- class="vcard"
| class="fn org" | Bishop's Cleeve
| class="adr" | Gloucestershire
| 
| class="note" | 
|- class="vcard"
| class="fn org" | Bishop's Court
| class="adr" | Isle of Man
| 
| class="note" | 
|- class="vcard"
| class="fn org" | Bishop's Down
| class="adr" | Dorset
| 
| class="note" | 
|- class="vcard"
| class="fn org" | Bishop's Frome
| class="adr" | Herefordshire
| 
| class="note" | 
|- class="vcard"
| class="fn org" | Bishopsgarth
| class="adr" | Stockton-on-Tees
| 
| class="note" | 
|- class="vcard"
| class="fn org" | Bishopsgate
| class="adr" | Surrey
| 
| class="note" | 
|- class="vcard"
| class="fn org" | Bishops Green
| class="adr" | Essex
| 
| class="note" | 
|- class="vcard"
| class="fn org" | Bishop's Green
| class="adr" | Hampshire
| 
| class="note" | 
|- class="vcard"
| class="fn org" | Bishop's Hull
| class="adr" | Somerset
| 
| class="note" | 
|- class="vcard"
| class="fn org" | Bishop's Itchington
| class="adr" | Warwickshire
| 
| class="note" | 
|- class="vcard"
| class="fn org" | Bishops Lydeard
| class="adr" | Somerset
| 
| class="note" | 
|- class="vcard"
| class="fn org" | Bishop's Norton
| class="adr" | Gloucestershire
| 
| class="note" | 
|- class="vcard"
| class="fn org" | Bishop's Nympton
| class="adr" | Devon
| 
| class="note" | 
|- class="vcard"
| class="fn org" | Bishop's Offley
| class="adr" | Staffordshire
| 
| class="note" | 
|- class="vcard"
| class="fn org" | Bishop's Quay
| class="adr" | Cornwall
| 
| class="note" | 
|- class="vcard"
| class="fn org" | Bishop's Stortford
| class="adr" | Hertfordshire
| 
| class="note" | 
|- class="vcard"
| class="fn org" | Bishop's Sutton
| class="adr" | Hampshire
| 
| class="note" | 
|- class="vcard"
| class="fn org" | Bishop's Tachbrook
| class="adr" | Warwickshire
| 
| class="note" | 
|- class="vcard"
| class="fn org" | Bishop's Tawton
| class="adr" | Devon
| 
| class="note" | 
|- class="vcard"
| class="fn org" | Bishopsteignton
| class="adr" | Devon
| 
| class="note" | 
|- class="vcard"
| class="fn org" | Bishopstoke
| class="adr" | Hampshire
| 
| class="note" | 
|- class="vcard"
| class="fn org" | Bishopston
| class="adr" | Swansea
| 
| class="note" | 
|- class="vcard"
| class="fn org" | Bishopston
| class="adr" | City of Bristol
| 
| class="note" | 
|- class="vcard"
| class="fn org" | Bishopstone
| class="adr" | Wiltshire
| 
| class="note" | 
|- class="vcard"
| class="fn org" | Bishopstone
| class="adr" | East Sussex
| 
| class="note" | 
|- class="vcard"
| class="fn org" | Bishopstone
| class="adr" | Herefordshire
| 
| class="note" | 
|- class="vcard"
| class="fn org" | Bishopstone
| class="adr" | Buckinghamshire
| 
| class="note" | 
|- class="vcard"
| class="fn org" | Bishopstone
| class="adr" | Swindon
| 
| class="note" | 
|- class="vcard"
| class="fn org" | Bishopstone
| class="adr" | Kent
| 
| class="note" | 
|- class="vcard"
| class="fn org" | Bishopstrow
| class="adr" | Wiltshire
| 
| class="note" | 
|- class="vcard"
| class="fn org" | Bishop Sutton
| class="adr" | Bath and North East Somerset
| 
| class="note" | 
|- class="vcard"
| class="fn org" | Bishop's Waltham
| class="adr" | Hampshire
| 
| class="note" | 
|- class="vcard"
| class="fn org" | Bishopswood
| class="adr" | Somerset
| 
| class="note" | 
|- class="vcard"
| class="fn org" | Bishops Wood
| class="adr" | Staffordshire
| 
| class="note" | 
|- class="vcard"
| class="fn org" | Bishopsworth
| class="adr" | City of Bristol
| 
| class="note" | 
|- class="vcard"
| class="fn org" | Bishop Thornton
| class="adr" | North Yorkshire
| 
| class="note" | 
|- class="vcard"
| class="fn org" | Bishopthorpe
| class="adr" | York
| 
| class="note" | 
|- class="vcard"
| class="fn org" | Bishopton
| class="adr" | Darlington
| 
| class="note" | 
|- class="vcard"
| class="fn org" | Bishopton
| class="adr" | Dumfries and Galloway
| 
| class="note" | 
|- class="vcard"
| class="fn org" | Bishopton
| class="adr" | North Yorkshire
| 
| class="note" | 
|- class="vcard"
| class="fn org" | Bishopton
| class="adr" | Renfrewshire
| 
| class="note" | 
|- class="vcard"
| class="fn org" | Bishopton
| class="adr" | Warwickshire
| 
| class="note" | 
|- class="vcard"
| class="fn org" | Bishopwearmouth
| class="adr" | Sunderland
| 
| class="note" | 
|- class="vcard"
| class="fn org" | Bishop Wilton
| class="adr" | East Riding of Yorkshire
| 
| class="note" | 
|- class="vcard"
| class="fn org" | Bishpool
| class="adr" | City of Newport
| 
| class="note" | 
|- class="vcard"
| class="fn org" | Bishton
| class="adr" | City of Newport
| 
| class="note" | 
|- class="vcard"
| class="fn org" | Bishton
| class="adr" | Staffordshire
| 
| class="note" | 
|- class="vcard"
| class="fn org" | Bisley
| class="adr" | Gloucestershire
| 
| class="note" | 
|- class="vcard"
| class="fn org" | Bisley
| class="adr" | Surrey
| 
| class="note" | 
|- class="vcard"
| class="fn org" | Bisley Camp
| class="adr" | Surrey
| 
| class="note" | 
|- class="vcard"
| class="fn org" | Bispham
| class="adr" | Lancashire
| 
| class="note" | 
|- class="vcard"
| class="fn org" | Bispham Green
| class="adr" | Lancashire
| 
| class="note" | 
|- class="vcard"
| class="fn org" | Bissoe
| class="adr" | Cornwall
| 
| class="note" | 
|- class="vcard"
| class="fn org" | Bissom
| class="adr" | Cornwall
| 
| class="note" | 
|- class="vcard"
| class="fn org" | Bisterne
| class="adr" | Hampshire
| 
| class="note" | 
|- class="vcard"
| class="fn org" | Bisterne Close
| class="adr" | Hampshire
| 
| class="note" | 
|- class="vcard"
| class="fn org" | Bitchet Green
| class="adr" | Kent
| 
| class="note" | 
|- class="vcard"
| class="fn org" | Bitchfield
| class="adr" | Lincolnshire
| 
| class="note" | 
|- class="vcard"
| class="fn org" | Bittadon
| class="adr" | Devon
| 
| class="note" | 
|- class="vcard"
| class="fn org" | Bittaford
| class="adr" | Devon
| 
| class="note" | 
|- class="vcard"
| class="fn org" | Bittering
| class="adr" | Norfolk
| 
| class="note" | 
|- class="vcard"
| class="fn org" | Bitterley
| class="adr" | Shropshire
| 
| class="note" | 
|- class="vcard"
| class="fn org" | Bitterne
| class="adr" | City of Southampton
| 
| class="note" | 
|- class="vcard"
| class="fn org" | Bitterne Park
| class="adr" | City of Southampton
| 
| class="note" | 
|- class="vcard"
| class="fn org" | Bitterscote
| class="adr" | Staffordshire
| 
| class="note" | 
|- class="vcard"
| class="fn org" | Bitteswell
| class="adr" | Leicestershire
| 
| class="note" | 
|- class="vcard"
| class="fn org" | Bittles Green
| class="adr" | Dorset
| 
| class="note" | 
|- class="vcard"
| class="fn org" | Bitton
| class="adr" | South Gloucestershire
| 
| class="note" | 
|- class="vcard"
| class="fn org" | Bix
| class="adr" | Oxfordshire
| 
| class="note" | 
|- class="vcard"
| class="fn org" | Bixter
| class="adr" | Shetland Islands
| 
| class="note" | 
|}